Jesús Kumate Rodríguez (13 November 1924 – 7 May 2018) was a Mexican physician and politician. He served as the Secretary of Health during the Presidency of Carlos Salinas de Gortari.

Early life and education
Kumate Rodríguez was born in Mazatlán in 1924 to a Japanese emigrant father and a Sinaloense mother who worked as a rural teacher. He graduated as a surgeon in 1946 from the Escuela Médico Militar and became a Doctor of Science at the Instituto Politécnico Nacional in 1963.

Career
During his tenure as Secretary of Health, Kumate Rodríguez oversaw the implementation of universal vaccination, the eradication of poliomyelitis, the combat against a cholera outbreak, the updating of epidemiological surveillance and the drastic decrease of infant mortality.

Honours
 Legion of Honour, Chevalier and Officier
 Belisario Domínguez Medal of Honor, 2006

References

External links
 Curriculum Vitae – Jesús Kumate Rodríguez

1924 births
2018 deaths
Mexican Secretaries of Health
Mexican surgeons
Politicians from Sinaloa
People from Mazatlán
Mexican politicians of Japanese descent
20th-century Mexican politicians
Instituto Politécnico Nacional alumni